Somos. is a Netflix limited series created by James Schamus and co-written with Monika Revilla and novelist Fernanda Melchor. It is based on the article "How the U.S. triggered a massacre in Mexico" by Pulitzer Prize-winning journalist Ginger Thompson. It tells the story of the massacre perpetrated by the Los Zetas cartel on the border town of Allende, Coahuila, in 2011.

Plot
Somos. is a portrait of the Mexican border town of Allende. It follows the stories of various townspeople on the days leading up to the massacre of March 2011.

Cast 
 Jero Medina as Benjamín
 Arelí González as Érika
 Iliana Donatlán as Irene
 Everardo Arzate as Chema
 Caraly Sánchez as Flor María
 Mercedes Hernández as Doña Chayo
 Fernando Larrañaga as Isidro Linares
 Jesús Sida as Paquito

Episodes

References

External links

 
 
 

Television shows filmed in Mexico
2020s Mexican drama television series
2021 Mexican television series debuts
Spanish-language Netflix original programming
Works about Mexican drug cartels